Palasan may refer to the following:

 Palasan, Valenzuela, barangay of the Philippines
 Palasan, barangay of the Philippines in the municipality of Burdeos
 Palasan Island, main island of the Palasan barangay in Burdeos
 Palasan, village in the Indian state of West Bengal
 Palasan, village in the Indian state of Gujarat
 Pălășan, Romanian family name